Jeremy James may refer to:

 Jeremy James (sculptor) (born 1964), British sculptor
 Jeremy James (singer/songwriter) (born 1977), American musician
 Jeremy James (bishop), Anglican bishop in Australia
 Jeremy James, a character in the novel Adventures with Jeremy James
 Jeremy James, presenter of TV shows including The Master Game

See also
 Jerry James (disambiguation)